Jacob Goll  (born November 14, 1992) is a German ice hockey goaltender. He is currently playing with TSV Peißenberg of the German Oberliga.

Goll made his Deutsche Eishockey Liga debut playing with EHC München during the 2011–12 DEL season.

References

External links

1992 births
Living people
EHC München players
German ice hockey goaltenders
Sportspeople from Duisburg